The Big Game is an Australian television game show which aired in 1966 on Melbourne station GTV-9. Tony Charlton was host. The series featured members of VFL teams answering general knowledge questions. Aired at 7:00PM on Thursdays. Aired against Green Acres on HSV-7, news on ABV-2, and Hogan's Heroes on ATV-0.

Archival status of the series is not known.

References

External links
The Big Game on IMDb

1966 Australian television series debuts
1966 Australian television series endings
1960s Australian game shows
Black-and-white Australian television shows
English-language television shows